Being Human in Public is the second EP by Canadian singer-songwriter Jessie Reyez. It was released on October 19, 2018, by FMLY and Island Records. It features guest appearances from JRM, Kehlani and Normani. The EP was placed on the longlist for the 2019 Polaris Music Prize. It won R&B/Soul Recording of the Year at the 2019 Juno Awards and was nominated for Best Urban Contemporary Album at the 2020 Grammy Awards.

Track listing

Charts

References

2018 EPs
Jessie Reyez albums